Francisco Javier Velázquez López (born 3 June 1951) is a Spanish civil servant   
who was from 18 April 2008 until  3 January 2012 Director General of the Police and Civil Guard. He was born in Castilblanco de los Arroyos, Andalusia, Spain and taught at the Charles III University of Madrid.

See also
 National Police Corps
 Civil Guard

References

External links
 Profile at the Ministry of the Interior

1951 births
Living people
People from Andalusia
Charles III University of Madrid alumni